Halais Lake is a lake in Hanoi, Vietnam, located next to Nguyễn Du Street, which used to be named "Rue Halais" under the French (1888-1945), hence the name "Halais". According to Vietnamese sources, it should be spelled "Halais Lake", the French name for the lake called "Hồ Thiền Quang" in Vietnamese.

References

Lakes of Hanoi
Lakes of Vietnam